Scardinius is a genus of ray-finned fish in the family Cyprinidae commonly called rudds. Locally, the name "rudd" without any further qualifiers is also used for individual species, particularly the common rudd (S. erythrophthalmus). The rudd can be distinguished from the very similar roach by way of the rudd's upturned mouth, allowing it to pick food items such as aquatic insects from the surface of the water with minimal disturbance.

The Greek rudd (S. graecus) is a similar fish, about 40 cm long. It occurs only in the southern tip of the Greek mainland. It lives in lakes and slow-flowing rivers, forming large schools. It spawns around April–June among underwater plants in shallow water. It feeds on small crustaceans, the larvae and pupae of insects, and on plant material. The majority of its food is taken at or near the surface of the water. The fish is not usually found in deep water. Very little is known about the biology of this species. It is important locally, both to anglers and commercial companies.

Species
 Scardinius acarnanicus Economidis, 1991
 Scardinius dergle Heckel & Kner, 1858
 Scardinius elmaliensis Bogutskaya, 1997
 Scardinius erythrophthalmus (Linnaeus, 1758) (common rudd)
 Scardinius graecus Stephanidis, 1937 (Greek rudd)
 Scardinius hesperidicus Bonaparte, 1845
 Scardinius knezevici Bianco & Kottelat, 2005
 Scardinius plotizza Heckel & Kner, 1858
 Scardinius racovitzai G. J. Müller, 1958
 Scardinius scardafa (Bonaparte, 1837)

References

External links 
 
 All About Rudd - Article

 
Cyprinidae genera
Taxa named by Charles Lucien Bonaparte
Taxonomy articles created by Polbot